Chester Football Club is an association football club based in Chester.

The club was founded in 2010 following the liquidation of Chester City. In its inaugural season it competed in Division One North of the Northern Premier League, following a successful appeal to the Football Association against its initial placement in the North West Counties League. After winning this division, it then won the Northern League Premier Division in 2011–12 and the Conference North in 2012–13. Chester returned to the National League North following relegation in 2017–18.

History

Background and formation
The original Chester FC was founded in 1885 and joined the Football League before the 1931–32 season. They changed their name to Chester City in 1983. They were members of the Football League, predominantly in its fourth tier but occasionally in its third tier, until 2000 when the club was relegated to the Football Conference. They returned to the Football League after winning the Conference title in 2004. Following relegation back to the Conference in 2009, the club hit financial difficulties. These financial difficulties led to the season starting with a 25-point deduction, following the Inland Revenue overturning a proposed CVA. Chester City were eventually wound up on 10 March 2010.

City Fans United (CFU) had been formed in October 2009, following growing disquiet among fans with the running of Chester City, who at that point were already in deep financial trouble. Only a month after the official formation of CFU, fans staged an on-pitch protest about Chester City's ownership, leading to the abandonment of the game against Eastbourne Borough at a point when Chester were leading 3–2. Following a vote of its membership, CFU in January 2010 called for a boycott of Chester City, after the dismissal of the then manager Jim Harvey, which led to CFU expressing its "disappointment, shock, and anger" at the decision. The group then began preparations in February 2010 to form a phoenix club for the following season just weeks before Chester City FC was wound up.

Following the official winding up of Chester City in March 2010, a ballot was held to choose the name for the new club. Over 1,000 people participated in the ballot and 70% voted for the name Chester FC, which had been the old club's name for its first 98 years. The club received the support of Cheshire West and Chester Council, which granted the lease of the Deva Stadium (subsequently renamed the Exacta Stadium as part of a sponsorship arrangement), Chester City's former ground, to Chester FC in May 2010.

Chester FC started competing in the 2010–11 season. The FA initially recommended that they should be placed in the North West Counties Football League Premier Division, a decision that the club appealed against. On 18 June 2010, the FA made a statement saying that Chester would instead be placed a step higher and would play in the Northern Premier League Division One North, the 8th tier of the English football league system.

Neil Young (2010–2014)
The club was formally relaunched on 20 May 2010, when Neil Young and Gary Jones were announced as the first manager and assistant of the club. A pre-season friendly played at Colwyn Bay on 10 July 2010 was the first fixture for the new club, the match resulting in a 2–1 victory for Colwyn Bay. The team's first home friendly was played against Aberystwyth Town, which the Blues won 3–0. The club's first league match was on 24 August 2010, away at Warrington Town. Rob Hopley scored the first ever goal for the club in the 6th minute, but the game ended in a 1–1 draw. Chester played their first home game against Trafford and won 6–0, Michael Wilde scoring a hat-trick. In September, Chester lost their first game after a 2–1 home defeat to Chorley. Chester went top of their division for the first time following a 2–1 win at Cammell Laird in October, before equalling their record win when they beat Ossett Albion 6–0 in January 2011, and recording their ninth consecutive away win at Trafford in the same month. Chester were ineligible to compete in either the FA Trophy and FA Cup during their inaugural season due to FA rules requiring a minimum of one season of prior football before playing in the Trophy, and two years before playing in the Cup. After their win at promotion rivals Skelmersdale in March, the Blues went 12 points clear at the top of the league, but a number of draws and defeats led to this margin being cut to just a single point by 16 April. Second-placed Skelmersdale then dropped points, to leave Chester three points clear with one remaining game, and a goal difference eight ahead of their chasing rivals. In a wild finale to the season, Chester were promoted by only a single point of goal difference, as the Blues went down to a shock 2–1 defeat at Garforth Town, while Skelmersdale thrashed Ossett Albion 7–2, with two goals from Ossett striker Danny Toronczak the difference between promotion and the playoffs for Chester.

Following Chester's promotion to the NPL Premier Division, form was initially variable, with two losses in their first six league fixtures. However, form, particularly defensively, improved greatly, with no goals conceded in September, and the 1–0 win against Chasetown was their seventh successive clean sheet in the league. This run ended after a 1–1 draw away at Buxton in the next match, but only after they established a new Chester City/Chester FC record of 781 minutes without conceding across eight games in all competitions. Chester's form was strong through November and December, with a run of five consecutive victories, resulting in Chester going top of the table after the 1–0 win against Ashton United, a position the club held at the end of the year, finishing 2011 with a stormy 1–1 draw at second placed Northwich Victoria, a game that saw three dismissals. They were not to be caught again in the league during the season. During the calendar year 2011, Chester were unbeaten in home league fixtures. Chester's last loss of the season came in their 2–1 home defeat to Hednesford on 21 January. After that point, the team went on a 16-match unbeaten run, including a period of eight consecutive victories encompassing the entirety of March. On 9 April 2012, Chester gained their second successive promotion, after a late goal from Matty McGinn in the game against second-placed Northwich gave the club a 1–1 draw and the point they needed to see off the challenge with three games remaining. The game was watched by a crowd of 5,009, which was not only a record for the reformed club, but also the highest gate ever recorded in the seventh tier of English football. At the conclusion of the season, Chester finished with 100 points, 17 clear of second-placed Northwich, having scored 102 goals along the way, and conceded only 29. In the 2011–12 FA Trophy, Chester went on an extended run, winning through three qualifying rounds to reach the first round proper, where they recorded a 5–1 away victory against North Ferriby United. They bowed out of the competition in the second round in an away tie against Conference Premier side Ebbsfleet United, losing 3–2. As this was only the club's second season, they remained ineligible for the FA Cup.

Chester began the 2012–13 season as second favourites with bookmakers for the Conference North title. Their start to the season justified those predictions, as they won their first seven matches, a club record for Chester FC and also surpassing Chester City's best start to the season. Included in that run were victories over pre-season favourites F.C. Halifax Town and a 4–0 drubbing of previously unbeaten Guiseley. Despite this, the club only sat in second place in the division, as Brackley Town also won each of their first seven games. The run came to an end with a 3–2 defeat at Boston United in Chester's eighth match. After two more victories, against Stalybridge Celtic and Bishop's Stortford, Chester went to the top of the table for the first time due to a 1–1 draw with Bradford Park Avenue. Following this draw, Chester then went on a run of twelve consecutive league victories, including a 3–2 win at Brackley. This run came to an end with a goalless draw, again against Bradford PA on 5 January, which was also the first league match of the season in which Chester failed to score. Chester were promoted to the Conference Premier following their 1–0 win at home to Boston United. In the FA Cup, Chester FC's first ever match was a 1–1 draw away at Gainsborough Trinity in the second qualifying round. Chester won the replay at the Exacta Stadium 2–1 with goals from Dominic Collins and Levi Mackin. Chester's third qualifying round tie, at home to FC Halifax Town, was marred by crowd trouble, and finished in a 1–1 draw. Chester exited the FA Cup following a 3–1 win by Halifax at The Shay in the replay. The FA Trophy proved less successful for Chester than in the previous season, as the Blues failed to win a single match, exiting in a replay at Worksop Town. On 6 April 2013, Chester were confirmed as champions of the Conference North, beating Boston United 1–0 at the Exacta through a Lewis Turner header, winning a third successive title, and in doing so, becoming the first club in English football history to achieve three successive promotions. Three promotions in their first three years means that Chester will play their next season's football in the Conference Premier, the level from which their predecessors Chester City were expelled in 2010. Chester set several league records for the Conference North in this prolific season: most wins (34), fewest defeats (3), most points (107), most goals scored (103), best goal difference (+71) and also the longest unbeaten streak (30 games).

Conference Premier (2013–2018)
As expected, for the 2013–14 season, Chester remained as a semi-professional club, despite the presence of a number of full-time clubs in the Conference Premier. Before the season, bookmakers had high expectations for the Blues, with bookmakers making them eighth favourites for the Conference title. However, the season started with the Blues in terrible form, with five consecutive defeats. Their losing run ended with a 2–0 away win against arch rivals Wrexham. This was the first Cross-border derby match since Chester had reformed. However, by the end of December Chester were still in the relegation zone with only four wins. On 8 January manager Neil Young left Chester by mutual consent after three and a half seasons. On 18 January 2014, Steve Burr was appointed as Young's replacement. Chester finished the season in 21st place and were relegated on goal difference. However, they were reprieved on 10 June after Hereford United, the team who finished above Chester in 20th place, were expelled from the Conference Premier due to financial irregularities.

Chester remained in the Conference Premier for the 2014–15 season, after being allowed to stay in the league due to the expulsion of Hereford United. Chester started the season by recording only one win in the month of August and were also beaten 5–0 on the opening day of the season against Barnet. Chester gradually started to pick their form up over a 4-month period and at the turn of the year Chester had a 4–0 win over Lincoln City. At this point, Chester were hovering around the Play Off positions. Chester's form dipped slightly throughout February, March and the start of April, leading to them slipping down the table away from the play-off places. Some of these defeats featured heavy defeats at the hands of Bristol Rovers and Forest Green in early April. However, they ended the season on a high by winning their final 3 games. Chester, in the final game of the season, came back from losing 3–1, to beat Nuneaton Town 5–3. Chester ended the season in 12th place with 63 points.

Chester played in the National league (originally named Conference Premier) for the duration of their 2015–16 season, where they picked up 8 wins and 6 draws from their first 23 matches to position themselves at 14th for the first half of the season. However, a dip in form saw Chester pick up 11 losses in their remaining fixtures. With four games remaining in the season, Chester sacked Steve Burr and he was replaced by his assistant manager, Jon McCarthy. Three wins in the final three games of the season however saw Chester finish in 17th in the Conference Premier with 54 points. 

Chester's form declined even more in the 2016–17 season where their 14-10-22 record saw them sit at 19th at the end of the season with 52 points; just 4 above the relegation zone.

Chester's fortune in the National league finally turned sour in the 2017–18 season. In January, Chester were on the brink of being dissolved, as they revealed that they needed to raise £50,000 in the short term in order to stay afloat. Chester FC fans raised over £100,000 via a number of fundraising activities including an all-stars game supported by Michael Owen and Ian Rush which ensured that the club would survive. However, following a 2–0 defeat to Tranmere Rovers, Chester were relegated from the National league. Ultimately, Chester finished the season with an 8-13-25 record. Their 23rd-place finish with 37 points lead them to be demoted to the National League North. At the end of the 2017–18 season, manager Marcus Bignot left the club by mutual consent.

Johnson & Morley (2018–2021)
Bignot was replaced by joint managers Anthony Johnson and Bernard Morley. Chester also gained Swansway Group as a new sponsor in the 2017–18 season, which resulted in their stadium gaining the nickname, the Swansway Chester Stadium (commonly known as the Deva Stadium). Chester had a promising start to their 2018–19 season in the National League North, as they gained 7 wins from their first 15 matches. In the same period of time though, Chester suffered one of their heaviest defeats in decades; losing 8–1 to Blyth Spartans. Overall, Chester achieved a solid 16-14-12 record, which elevated them to 9th on the table with 62 points. In fact, Chester were just 3 points off a playoff promotion spot. In the FA Cup, Chester were defeated 4–3 in the third qualifying round by ninth tier Dunston UTS.

In the following season, Chester finished in 6th place after a decision to end the season in March due to the disruption caused by the COVID-19 pandemic. The season was finished on a points per game basis, however, Chester lost out by 3–2 in the play-offs to Altrincham. In January 2021, the National League North season was declared null and void with Chester in 3rd place after 17 matches.

Steve Watson (2021–2022)
Steve Watson was appointed manager on 23 December 2021. In his first game he recorded 3–1 victory away to Telford United on Boxing Day. He left the club my mutual consent at the end of the season.

Crest and colours

Crest

The crest was designed by Martin Huxley, a Chester-based graphic artist and Chester F.C. fan, who described the symbols in the crest thus: "The Wolf dates back to when William the Conqueror's nephew, Hugh d'Avranches was appointed the Earl of Chester. He had the nickname 'Lupus', the Latin translation for 'wolf'. The crown refers to Chester being a royalist City. Badge variations make it unclear whether the leaves are laurel, a recognised symbol of victory, or oak, a significant (and common) tree in Chester. Oak has long been used in the Cheshire Regiment's logo, reference to saving King George II's life beneath an oak tree at the Battle of Dettingen in 1743."

In keeping with the club's crest, Chester's mascot is a friendly wolf called 'Big Lupus'.

Colours
Chester play in blue and white top with black shorts and blue socks, similar to their predecessors Chester City. For their first two seasons their shirts were made by sportswear company Joma; from the 2012–13 season the kit was made by Puma until a new three year kit deal with Kappa was made in 2019, while since reformation the club's kit has been sponsored by MBNA. The Blues' away shirt colour has changed on an bi-annual basis, having been purple in their first season, yellow in 2011–12 and green in 2012–13. The new home kit was chosen by the fans and the away kit was designed by a Junior Blue via a competition.

Shirt sponsors and manufacturers

Stadium

Chester F.C. play at the Deva Stadium, the home of their predecessor. It has a capacity of 6,500 with 4,170 seated. The stadium was leased to the club by Cheshire West and Chester Council.

The highest home league attendance at the Deva Stadium was in April 2012 against Northwich Victoria, with a crowd of 5,009.

England–Wales border
The stadium is located in the Sealand Road Industrial Estate and straddles the England-Wales border. The pitch and all of the stands are in Flintshire, Wales, though the stadium car park, main entrance, and some of the offices are in England.  In January 2022, the club was threatened with legal action by North Wales Police and Flintshire County Council for failing to apply the COVID-19 regulations applying in Wales and allowing crowds to attend matches at the ground.  On 8 January 2022, the Welsh Government stated that, as the stadium was in Wales it was subject to Wales' COVID restrictions, and Andy Morris, the club chairman, said that the location of the ground "had become a very real problem".

Rivals

The club's predominant rival is Wrexham, as the two clubs are 12 miles apart from each other. In league competitions, the two clubs have met each other 86 times (10 following the liquidation of Chester City). Chester also inherited several rivalries from its predecessor including: Macclesfield Town, Tranmere Rovers, Crewe Alexandra and Shrewsbury Town. During Chester's early years, they formed rivalries with local clubs such as: Vauxhall Motors, Witton Albion, Warrington Town, Nantwich Town, and Northwich Victoria. On Chester's way back to the National League, they also formed smaller rivalries with Chorley and Southport.

Players

Current squad

 (on loan from Everton)

 (on loan to Runcorn Linnets)
 (on loan to Runcorn Linnets)
 (on loan from Shrewsbury Town)

International appearances

The following table shows players who have received an international cap while playing for the club (including substitutions) arranged alphabetically by nation in descending order:

Most league appearances and goals

The following table shows players who have made 50 league appearances or more for the club (including substitutions) and players who have scored 25 league goals or more for the club (including penalties) in descending order:

Management

Current management and coaching staff
As of 11 May 2022

Managerial history

Includes all league and cup competitions

Honours

League
Conference North (Tier 6)
Champions: 2012–13
Northern Premier League Premier Division
Champions: 2011–12 (Tier 7)
Northern Premier League Division One North
Champions: 2010–11

Cups
Cheshire Senior Cup
 Winners: 2012–13

Other trophies
Peter Swales Shield
 Winners: 2012
Brian Lomax Supporters Direct Cup
 Winners: 2011
Supporters Direct Shield
 Winners: 2019

References

External links

City Fans United website
Chester FC coverage from the Chester Chronicle

 
Football clubs in Cheshire
Association football clubs established in 2010
Fan-owned football clubs in England
Northern Premier League clubs
National League (English football) clubs
2010 establishments in England
Phoenix clubs (association football)
Football clubs in England